Dr. Shiv Prasad Kosta (born 25 April 1931) is a space scientist, educationist and a technocrat and currently the Group Director of Shri Ram Institute of Technology in Jabalpur and Charotar University of Science and Technology, Changa, Gujarat. During his whole career as a scientist, he has given contribution in different organizations, including the national strategic space research centre of India ISRO. Former President Dr. A. P. J. Abdul Kalam and former Chief Election Commissioner T. N. Seshan were his colleagues in ISRO during 1981 to 1995.

Educational and family background

Kosta was born 25 April 1931 in Garha, a part of Sanskardhani in Jabalpur. He belonged to a poverty-stuck family of a farmer. While talking about his early education, Kosta Sir has completed his primary, middle, secondary and higher secondary education from Government Technical High School Kala Niketan. Kosta passed his high school technical examination from Government Technical High School Jabalpur in 1952 and joined Government Science College (formerly known as Robertson College), where he obtained M.Sc. in physics and electronics from Sagar University of M.P in 1958.

Professional career as engineer and scientist

Kosta started with his professional career as a research assistant in 1958 by joining Ministry of Education in New Delhi through UPSC. In the year 1962, he travelled to Germany and received scholarship from Indo-Germany exchange to deliver his services and explore technological skills in Stuttgart and Munich. Here, he worked as development engineer for a period of about one year, from 1961 to 1962. He proceeded with his work as engineer in Andrew Corporation of Chicago from 1962 to 1963. In 1964, Kosta joined National Physics Laboratory of India in New Delhi as junior scientist and worked for a period of 3 months. After this, September 1964, he delivered his skills as Senior Scientist and Officer in CEERI (Central Electronics Engineering Research Institute) of Pilani in Rajasthan.

Contribution in ISRO centre of India

In 1971, Kosta joined as principal technical officer and deputy director of first Indian Satellite Project Aryabhata (satellite) in [RO. Later on, he was promoted as Group Director of ISRO Satellite Centre in Bangalore and contributed his skills and ideas for Remote Sensing Satellites and application satellite projects, as Communication Satellite, Bhaskara (satellite) and Ariane Passenger Payload Experiment. Furthermore, starting from 1981 to 1987, Kosta delivered his services in headquarters of ISRO located in Bangalore. During the entire career of Kosta in ISRO, he got the opportunity for working as team with large numbers of countrywide and international scientists, including the scientist-cum-former president Dr. A. P. J. Abdul Kalam.

Other services

After successful accomplishment of various projects under ISRO, Kosta was the Director in Department of Electronics, now Department of Electronics and Information Technology Government of India from 1987 to 1990. In 1990, he took the position of Vice Chancellor of Jabalpur University of M.P Government. Kosta worked in University until 1994 and then joined as Director General of M.M. Vedic University Jabalpur (M.P.). He made contributions to Vedic University up to year 2000. Currently, Kosta works under two institutions i.e. Director in Shri Ram Institute of Technology in Jabalpur and Chief Technical Advisor in Sagar Group of Institutes in Bhopal and Charotar University of Science & Technology in Changa, Gujarat.

Publications
Kosta has remained the author of about 10 different books published in Hindi on different ISRO Projects, books on various Indian satellites, like Ariane Passenger Payload Experiment, Bhaskara (satellite) and Aryabhata (satellite). In addition, he was the author of famous books on Communication Satellite and SLV3. Lastly, his publication will include the first Rocket launched by Dr. Kalam.

Research work
During the research work, Kosta guided large numbers for M.Tech. and Ph.D. degrees. Three of his bright students have gained the opportunity to serve as Principal in Electronics Department under Rani Durgavati University.

Tuneable dual-band antenna novel
Kosta, along with his partners, presented an engineered novel about tuneable, metamaterial and dual-band type of antenna working primarily on the array of split ring resonator or SRR. Negative SRR stack of antenna adds enhanced tuning ability to it even with marginal trade-off in between cross polarization and antenna gain.

Patch antenna with negative refractive-index applications in wideband
Kosta contributed in the introduction of patch antenna loaded with materials delivering negative refractive index. He and its other partners opined that the antenna suits perfectly for countless ultra wideband applications, while the operation achieved via deflected ground plane combined with CNC split resonator.

Overview and analysis on best utilization of split ring resonators
This research paper created by Kosta and his colleagues Dwivedi and Upadhyaya concerns primarily about the best utilization of split ring resonators within multiple materials negative permeability. In addition, the citation focuses on various concepts and production procedures related to isotropic medium of negative permeability, CPW support propagation of a particular left-handed wave and wire media that exhibits negative permittivity.

Human blood-based amplifier
Kosta's team have developed for the first time an amplifier circuit in discrete format based on human blood plasma that operates on IC or integrated Circuit configuration mode. Human blood contains large numbers of negative and positive charge carriers as atomic ions or molecules to serve as electrically conducting mediums. 
Hence, experts can use them to develop various electronic circuit devices and specific application circuits. Indeed, the newly designed electronic circuits will have many applications related to bio-medical engineering, health or medical science and various other related techniques.

Liquid (human blood) memristor analysis 
Kosta and his colleagues have used therapeutic methodology to make physical models network containing alignment of three different memristors in parallel and in series combination to study the function of its components. 
The citation highlights the characteristics of liquid (human blood) memristor or its proper combination to fulfil specific or potential applications in the sector of biomedical electronics, artificial brain, man and machine interface and envisaged signal processing and lots more.

Human blood-based electronic transistor
Kosta and his team have, for the first time, studied the 'human blood-based electronic transistor' (HBBET). Effects of variables like blood temperature, blood flow rate, and distance between the forming probes on the input/output characteristics as well as current gain factor β of the transistor are studied. Emerging applications of bio-material human tissue blood electronic circuits towards cyborg implants, human-machine interface, human disease detection/healing, human health sensors and digital signal processing is visualised.

Awards and honours

References

Sources

Further reading

 

 
 
 
 http://www.bkbiet.ac.in/wp-content/uploads/2013/10/ICCS-2013_Program-Schedule_FINAL.pdf
 
 

1931 births
Living people
20th-century Indian educational theorists
Scientists from Madhya Pradesh
Indian space scientists
People from Jabalpur